The Unified Socialists or the Socialiste Unifié was a political party in constitutional period Persia.

References

External links
Five documents from Ejtemāʿīyūn-e Etteḥādīyūn

Defunct socialist parties in Iran
Political parties in Qajar Iran
Political parties with year of disestablishment missing
Political parties with year of establishment missing